The following is a timeline of the history of the city of Strasbourg, Alsace, France.

Ancient history

 12th C. BCE – Area settled by proto-Celts.
 3rd C. BCE – Celts develop township.
 12 BCE – Nero Claudius Drusus establishes Argentoratum as a military fort on the western bank of the Rhine River in preparation for his planned invasion of Germania.
 90 CE – Legio VIII Augusta stationed in Argentoratum.
 4th C. CE – Catholic diocese of Strassburg established.
 357 CE – Battle of Argentoratum.
 407 CE – Vandals, Sueves, and Alans attack the city after crossing the frozen Rhine on New Year's Eve 406 AD. Sometime later that year, the city is reclaimed by the rebel forces of the usurper Constantine III.
 451 CE – Attila the Hun takes Argentoratum during his Gallic campaign.

Prior to 14th century

 5th C. – Franks in power.
 842 – Oaths of Strasbourg.
 923 – City acquired by the Holy Roman Empire.
 1230 – Saint Stephen’s Church opened
 1250 – Ponts Couverts opened
 1262 – Battle of Hausbergen, after which the city gains Reichsfreiheit.

14th–16th centuries
 1307 – Monastery of Hermits of Saint William built. Gottfried von Hagenau introduces the Feast of the Immaculate Conception in Strasbourg.
 1332 – Straßburger Revolution.
 1348 – Bubonic plague.
 1349 – Strasbourg massacre - Jews burned for "causing a pestilence by poisoning the wells".
 1354 – Three Kings clock erected.
 1362 – Fritsche Closener writes Straßburger Chronik, a history of the city.
 1381 - City joined the Städtebund, or league of Swabian towns.
 1414 – Sigismund, Holy Roman Emperor visits Strasbourg (7–14 July)  
 1415 – Paper mill established.
 1427 – Kammerzell House built.
 1439 – Strasbourg Cathedral finished.
 1440s – Johannes Gutenberg develops printing technique.
 1444 – Population: circa 20,000
 1458 – Johannes Mentelin opens print shop (approximate date).
 1464 – Heinrich Eggestein opens print shop (approximate date).
 1466 – World's first spectacle specialist shop opened in Strasbourg.
 1468 – World's first printed advertisement published in Strasbourg.

 1483 –  printer in business.
 1518 – Dancing plague.
 1521 – St. Thomas finished.
 1523 – Protestant Reformation (approximate date).
 1538
 Lutheran Gymnasium founded.
 University of Strasbourg founded.
 1552 – 19 September, Charles V, Holy Roman Emperor visits Strasbourg.
 1570 – Christkindelsmärik begins.
 1574 – Astronomical clock erected, designed by Christian Herlin.
 1585 – Neubau inaugurated
 1588 – Grosse Metzig built.
 1592 – Strasbourg Bishops' War breaks out over disputed election to the bishopric

17th–18th centuries
 1605 – Relation aller Fürnemmen und gedenckwürdigen Historien newspaper in publication.
 1619 – Jardin botanique de l'Université de Strasbourg established.
 1621 – University founded.
 1681 – City annexed by Louis XIV of France.
 1684 – Citadel built.
 1690 – Barrage Vauban opened.
 1697 – French annexation recognised by the Holy Roman Empire.
 1701 – Opera house opens.
 1725 – New Hospital completed
 1728 – World's first school for midwives opened in Strasbourg
 1732 – Episcopal Palace inaugurated.

 1736 – Hôtel de Hanau built. Hôtel de Klinglin built.
 1742
 Palais Rohan inaugurated.
 Place Broglie laid out.
 1755 – Hôtel Gayot built
 1765 - Saint Aurelia's Church re-inaugurated.
 1770 – Marie-Antoinette in Strasbourg.
 1771 – Goethe in Strasbourg.
 1778 – Mozart in Strasbourg (10 October - 3 November). He meets with Franz Xaver Richter, Johann Andreas Silbermann, Johann Baptist Wendling, Maximilian of Zweibrücken, and others.
 1772 – Place Kléber built.
 1790 – City becomes part of the Bas-Rhin souveraineté.
 1792
 "La Marseillaise" composed by Rouget de Lisle.
 University closed.
 1793 – Population: 47,254.

19th century

 1801 – Musée des Beaux-Arts de Strasbourg collection founded.
 1805 – Napoleon in Strasbourg (also in 1806 and 1809).
 1821 – Théâtre Municipal opens.
 1823 – 5 December: Franz Liszt, aged 12, gives his first concert on French soil.
 1831 – Georg Büchner in Strasbourg (until 1833)
 1832 – Société des Amis des arts founded.
 1836 – Louis-Napoleon Bonaparte in Strasbourg
 1843 – Astronomical clock erected, designed by Jean-Baptiste Schwilgué.
 1846 – Gare de Strasbourg opens.
 1849 – Richard Wagner in Strasbourg (also in 1853 [with Liszt], 1858, and 1872 [with Cosima, and Nietzsche]).
 1853 – Marne–Rhine Canal opens.
 1855 – Orchestra and  founded.
 1861 – Rhine Bridge, Kehl built.
 1862 - Association philomathique d'Alsace et de Lorraine founded.
 1870 – Siege of Strasbourg; art museum and city library destroyed.
 1871 – City becomes capital city of Reichsland Elsaß-Lothringen, German Empire.
 1872
 Bibliothek established.
 University reopens as Kaiser-Wilhelms-Universität.
  (publisher) in business.
 Population: 85,654.
 1873 – Théâtre Municipal rebuilt.
 1874 – Fort Rapp and other fortifications built.
 1877 – Elsäßische Neueste Nachrichten begins publication.
 1878
  Stele of Caius Largennius is discovered
 Strasbourg tramway (horse drawn) founded.
 1880
 Place de la République construction begins.
 Population: 104,471.
 1881 – Observatory inaugurated.
 1883
 Kunstgewerbe Museum founded.
 Strasbourg-Ville station rebuilt.
 1884 – Palais Universitaire built.
 1889 – Kaiserpalast inaugurated.
 1890 – Hohenlohe-Museum, Cabinet des estampes et des dessins collection, and  Fussball Klub Straßburg founded.
 1891 – Population: 123,500.
 1893 – Musée zoologique de la ville de Strasbourg building constructed.
 1894 - Strasbourg tramway electrified.
 1897 – St. Paul's Church built.
 1898
 Palais de Justice built.
 Synagogue du Quai Kléber built.
 1900
 FC Frankonia 1900 Straßburg (football club) formed.
 Population: 150,268.

20th century

 1901 – Saint-Pierre-le-Jeune Protestant Church restored.
 1903 – Sängerhaus inaugurated
 1904
 Hôtel Brion built.
 Sainte-Madeleine Church destroyed by fire.
 1905 – Population: 167,678.
Gustav Mahler, Richard Strauss and Romain Rolland in Strasbourg for the First Alsatian Music Festival (Premier Festival Alsacien de Musique)
 1906 – Fußball Club Neudorf founded.
 1907
 Musée alsacien opens.
 Sainte-Madeleine Church rebuilt.
 1911 – Population: 178,891.
 1914 – Stade de la Meinau opens.

 1918 – Alsace returns to France.
 1919 – Institut Européen d'Etudes Commerciales Supérieures de Strasbourg established.
 1920
 Musée historique de Strasbourg founded.
 City designated headquarters of Central Commission for Navigation on the Rhine.
 1928
 Aubette redecorated.
 Strasbourg Illkirch Graffenstaden Basket formed.
 1931
 Musée de l'Œuvre Notre-Dame founded.
 Population: 181,465.
 1935
 Strasbourg Airport opens.
 8–10 June: first "International Olympics of Workers' Music and Songs" (I. Internationale Arbeiter-Musik- und Gesangs-Olympiade), featuring Hanns Eisler, and Ernst Busch.
 1938 – City co-hosts the 1938 FIFA World Cup.
 1940
 Alsace occupied and annexed to Germany. Adolf Hitler in Strasbourg.
 July: Frontstalag 210 prisoner-of-war camp established by the Germans.
 November: Frontstalag 210 POW camp dissolved.
 November: Stalag V-D POW camp established by the Germans.
 1941 – Reichsuniversität Straßburg formed.
 1942 – Stalag V-D POW camp dissolved.
 1944
 23 November: City liberated from Germans.
 27 November: Charles Frey becomes mayor.
 1945 – Institut d'études politiques de Strasbourg established.
 1947 – Parts of the municipal art collections destroyed by accidental fire in Palais Rohan.
 1949 – Council of Europe headquartered in Strasbourg.
 1954
 Amis du vieux Strasbourg (historical society) founded.
 Population: 200,921.
 1959
 Pierre Pflimlin becomes mayor.
 City designated headquarters of European Court of Human Rights.
 1960 - Strasbourg tramway closed.
 1965 – City designated Seat of the European Parliament.
 1963 – La belle Strasbourgeoise bought, then the costliest painting ever purchased by a French museum.

 1967 – Urban Community of Strasbourg established.
 1969 – International Institute of Human Rights founded.
 1972
 Administration of Urban Community of Strasbourg and City of Strasbourg merged into one entity.
 Opéra du Rhin formed.
 1973 - Strasbourg Museum of Modern and Contemporary Art established.
 1974
 European Science Foundation established.
 Discovery of Johann Sebastian Bach's personal copy of the printed edition of the "Goldberg Variations" with the hitherto unknown fourteen canons, BWV 1087.
 1975 – Palais de la musique et des congrès built (twice expanded afterwards: 1989, 2015)
 1977 – Palace of Europe built.
 1978 – City hosts the 1978 European Figure Skating Championships.
 1982 – Strasbourg becomes part of the Alsace region.
 1984 – City hosts UEFA European Football Championship.
 1987 – Internationaux de Strasbourg tennis tournament begins.
 1988 – Pope John Paul II addresses the European Parliament and the Council of Europe
 1989
 Human Frontier Science Program established.
 City designated headquarters of Eurimages.
 1990 – Population: 252,338.
 1991 – École nationale d'administration relocates to Strasbourg.
 1992
 City designated headquarters of European Audiovisual Observatory and Eurocorps.
 Arte television begins broadcasting.
 Musée archéologique renovated.
 1994 – Trams begin operating.
 1995 – Nuits Européennes begins.
 1998 – Strasbourg Museum of Modern and Contemporary Art building opens.
 1999 – Louise Weiss building inaugurated.
 2000 
 Étoile Noire de Strasbourg ice hockey team formed.
 Strasbourg Cathedral bombing plot

21st century
 2001
 Fabienne Keller becomes mayor.
 2005
 Strasbourg-Ortenau eurodistrict formed.
 Patinoire Iceberg rink and Le Vaisseau open.
 2006 – Population: 272,975.
 2007 – Musée Tomi Ungerer/Centre international de l'illustration opens.
 2008
 École européenne de Strasbourg opens.
 Le Festival européen du film fantastique de Strasbourg begins.
 Roland Ries becomes mayor.
 2009 – City hosts NATO Strasbourg–Kehl summit.
 2011 –- Population: 272,222.
 2012 – Population: 274,394
 2014
 Pope Francis addresses the European Parliament and the Council of Europe.
 March:  held.
 June: City hosts the 2014 European Fencing Championships.
 2015 – Population: 277,270
 December:  held.
 2016 – Strasbourg becomes part of the Grand Est region.
 2018 – A jihadist attacks civilians near the Christmas market, killing five (December 11).

See also
 History of Strasbourg
 List of mayors of Strasbourg
 European institutions in Strasbourg
 Bishopric of Strasbourg
 Archbishop of Strasbourg
 

Other cities in the Grand Est region:
 Timeline of Metz
 Timeline of Mulhouse
 Timeline of Nancy, France
 Timeline of Reims
 Timeline of Troyes

References

This article incorporates information from the French Wikipedia.

Bibliography

in English
 
 
 
  (+ 1852 Handbook for the Rhine

in French
 
 
  v.1, v.2

in German

External links

 Map of Strasbourg, 1985
 Items related to Strasbourg, various dates (via Europeana).
 Items related to Strasbourg, various dates (via Digital Public Library of America).

Strasbourg